Glyphodes militaris is a moth in the family Crambidae. It was described by Eugene G. Munroe in 1976. It is found on Borneo.

References

Moths described in 1976
Glyphodes